A Smoky Mountain Christmas is a 1986 American made-for-television musical fantasy film starring Dolly Parton and Lee Majors, directed by Henry Winkler. It was originally broadcast on ABC on December 14, 1986.

Plot
Country music superstar Lorna Davis (Dolly Parton) is overwhelmed and disillusioned by her career and loneliness.  She plans a trip to a friend's cabin in Tennessee's Smoky Mountains to escape from Los Angeles and recuperate during the Christmas season.

Upon arriving there, Lorna finds it has become the impromptu home of seven orphans who are hiding from the orphanage in town.  They actually discover her sleeping in one of the beds (an allusion to the Seven Dwarfs finding Snow White), to which the youngest proclaims: "I know who she is.  She's the Angel."

Because they both have secrets to keep - the children don't want to be found by the orphanage and Lorna doesn't want to be found by anyone from L.A. - they agree to keep each other's presence at the cabin a secret.  She then quickly builds strong friendships with them, although it takes a while to win over cautious Jake, the eldest.

Little does she know, Lorna has been followed there by Harry (Dan Hedaya), a sleazy and enterprising paparazzo who is determined to reveal her hidden location.  In addition to him, she faces Jezebel (Anita Morris), a mountain "witch woman" who is determined to kill her for attracting the eye of her lover, John Jensen (Bo Hopkins), the sheriff of the nearby town.  She is saved from Jezebel's first attempt on her life by Mountain Dan (Lee Majors), a wandering mountain man who is wise to the ways of "mountain folk."

After Harry reveals Lorna's identity to John, she is arrested and the children are taken back to the orphanage. Jezebel, disguised as an old woman, delivers a poisoned pie to Lorna in prison, but is tricked into eating it herself and falls into an endless sleep.  Lorna is freed by Jake, Dan, and Harry and they formulate a plan to free the children from the orphanage.

Dressed as Santa Claus and a helper elf, Dan and Lorna are able to get into the orphanage and free them, only to be stopped by John while trying to escape.

They are taken before extremely uninterested Judge Harold Benton (John Ritter) who eventually dismisses all charges against Lorna and Dan and grants custody of the children to her.

Selected cast
 Dolly Parton as Lorna Davis
 Lee Majors as Dan "Mountain Dan"
 Dan Hedaya as Harry 
 Anita Morris as Jezebel
 Bo Hopkins as Sheriff John Jensen 
 John Ritter as Judge Harold Benton
 Rance Howard as Dr. Jennings
 René Auberjonois as Ned
 Jean Speegle as Old Lady Jezebel 
 Chad Sheets as Jake
 Danny Cooksey as Jasper
 Ashley Bank as Mary 
 Gennie James as Cindy 
 Daryl Bartley as Freddie 
 Marc D. Robinson as "String Bean"
 Micah Rowe as Buster
 Jeanne Hepple as Matty
 Linda Hoy as Hatty
 Douglas Seale as Vernon 
 Claude Earl Jones as The Bartender
 Chris Nash as Deputy Frank
 David Ackroyd as Video Director 
 Carl Franklin as Lieutenant Danvers
 Marc Flanagan as Cop
 Debra Christofferson as Nurse
 Clint Parton as Clint
 Bryan Seaver as Bryan

Songs
The movie features seven songs. They were all written by Parton except "(I'd Like to Spend) Christmas with Santa" which was written by her uncle Bill Owens. A soundtrack album for the movie was never released. In 2022, Parton included "A Smoky Mountain Christmas", "(I'd Like to Spend) Christmas with Santa", and "Wrapped Up in You" on the Ultimate Deluxe Edition of her album A Holly Dolly Christmas.

"Country Memories"
"Mountain Magic"
"Look on the Bright Side"
"(I'd Like to Spend) Christmas with Santa"
"Pretty Is as Pretty Does"
"A Smoky Mountain Christmas"
"Wrapped Up in You"

Home media
The film was released on VHS on October 8, 1992.

See also
 List of Christmas films

References

External links

1986 television films
1986 films
1980s musical fantasy films
ABC network original films
American television films
American Christmas films
American musical fantasy films
Christmas television films
Films directed by Henry Winkler
Dolly Parton
1980s Christmas films
1980s American films
1980s English-language films